A head coach, senior coach, or manager is a professional at training and developing athletes. They typically hold a more public profile and are paid more than other coaches. In some sports, the head coach is instead called the "manager", as in association football and professional baseball. In other sports, such as Australian rules football, the head coach is generally termed a senior coach. A head coach typically reports to a sporting director or a general manager of the team.

Other coaches are usually subordinate to the head coach, often in offensive or defensive positions, and occasionally proceed down into individualized position coaches.

American football

Head coaching responsibilities in American football vary depending on the level of the sport.

High school football
As with most other head coaches, high school coaches are primarily tasked with organizing and training football players. This includes creating game plans, evaluating players, and leading the team during competition.

High school head coaches also have a variety of responsibilities beyond the football field. These include recruiting students within the school, scheduling opponents, and training/hiring/leading lower-level coaches. Most coaches hold another position within their program's school, typically as an academic teacher.

College football 
One of the major features of head coaching in college football is the high turnover rate for jobs. With few exceptions (notable ones including Jimmye Laycock, Joe Paterno, John McKay, Tom Osborne, Bill Snyder, Frank Beamer, Bo Schembechler, Woody Hayes, Bobby Bowden, Darrell Royal, and LaVell Edwards) college coaches often routinely change jobs, rarely staying at a school for more than a decade. Some coaches have been known to leave a school and then return to the program after a period of time, with notable examples being Hall of Famers Robert Neyland and Chris Ault, who each had three stints at a single school (respectively Tennessee and Nevada).

Many head coaches at the college level have a paid staff and as such are more free to concentrate on the overall aspect of the team rather than dealing with the nuances of training regimens and similar activities.

Unlike head coaches at other levels, college coaching staffs are solely responsible for the composition and development of players on the team. The ability to recruit and develop top players plays a major role in success at this level.

College head coaches report to the athletic director at their respective university.

A college coach acts as the face of a team, in a sport where the players regularly depart after a few years, compared to some coaches who have been in the same position for over a generation. They are often called upon to discuss off-the-field incidents such as rule infractions or player antics. Sometimes, the coach becomes a celebrity in his own right, such as Lou Holtz.

In a majority of states, the head coach of a public university's football or men's basketball program is by far the highest-paid state public official, well above the salary for the state's governor.

At the end of the year, there are numerous college football coach of the year awards given out. Major annual coaching honors include the Home Depot Coach of the Year, The Liberty Mutual Coach of the Year Award, the Associated Press College Football Coach of the Year Award, and The Paul 'Bear' Bryant Award.

National Football League

At the professional level, coaches may work for millions of dollars a year. Since they do not have to travel the country recruiting high school players, head coaches at the professional level have much more time to devote to tactics and playbooks, which are coordinated with staff paid even more than at the college level. They typically report to the general manager.

Many factors are part of National Football League (NFL) coaches' contracts. These involve the NFL's $11 billion as the highest revenue sport, exceeding   Major League Baseball's (MLB) $7 billion. The NFL's coaches are among the highest-paid professional coaches with professional football salaries topping a 2011 Forbes article on the highest-paid sports coaches. Bill Belichick was listed at the number one spot for the second year in a row. Additionally, no MLB manager or National Hockey League coach made the list.

Another major element of NFL coaches' contracts, negotiated between individual coaches and NFL teams/owners, are NFL-demanded provisions in the employment contracts of coaches that authorize the employing NFL teams to withhold part of a coach's salary when league operations are suspended, such as lockouts or television contract negotiations.

Salary
In 2013, the average annual salary for a head coach in the National Football League was $6.45 million.

Association football

In association football, a head coach has the same responsibilities as in any other sport. For instance, in European countries, a head coach usually picks their own coaching staff. The main difference is a head coach usually works with a director of football, with the latter responsible for player recruitment and negotiating contracts. In the United Kingdom, these roles are combined in the position of manager.

In some countries, an individual may be granted a position as senior coach and acts as the first assistant to the head coach, or runs a junior squad in the club. In the absence of a head coach, a senior coach can temporarily take over as an interim head coach (or caretaker manager).

Australian rules football 

In Australian rules football, the head coach or senior coach, is responsible for developing and implementing appropriate training programs to his players. The senior coach in the AFL is also responsible for determining the rotations and team line ups for each game. Moreover, the coaches are not the only ones involved in team operations, as in AFL teams, up to five different coaches may have their own unique responsibilities. For example, there can be a forward, a midfield, and a defence coach, each focusing on a particular position. Thus, each coach works with players in those positions.

Rugby union 
Rugby football union clubs have the option of employing a director of rugby (DoR), a head coach, or both. The responsibilities for each role vary between clubs. Generally, if a club decides on employing one of either a DoR or a head coach, it will hold more responsibility than if it employs individuals for both roles. It has been proposed that the DoR is a club-wide position, providing and ensuring the club is working towards a shared philosophy from youth teams to senior teams. Whereas a head coach is focused purely on planning and implementing coaching for the first team; alongside a coaching team consisting of a mixture of defence, attack, forwards, backs, skills and strength and conditioning coaches.

American Track & Field 

Head coaching responsibilities for American or USA Track & Field vary depending on the level of the sport.

College Track & Field 

Bill Bowerman was an American track and field Head Coach for the University of Oregon and co-founder of Nike, Inc.

American Distance Running 

Head coaching responsibilities for Long-distance running vary depending on the level of the sport.

College Cross Country 

At the College or University level, Cross country running head coaching responsibilities vary widely depending on the program's budget and staffing.

See also
Coach (sport)
Coach (basketball)
Manager (baseball)
:Category:Women's association football managers
:Category:Association football coaches
Manager (association football)
:Category:American soccer coaches
:Category:American expatriate soccer coaches
:Category:American women's soccer coaches
Coach (ice hockey)
Coaching tree
Athletics director
Strength and conditioning coach
:Category:Sports coaches
:Category:American sports coaches
:Category:American track and field coaches
U.S. Track & Field and Cross Country Coaches Association

References 

Terminology used in multiple sports
American football occupations
 
Sports coaches
Training
Association football occupations
Athletics (track and field) coaches